"Medicopter 117 – Jedes Leben zählt“ (English: Medicopter 117 – Every life counts)  is a German language television series that RTL and ORF broadcast.  Medicopter 117 has seven seasons in 81 episodes and a pilot movie.

Medicopter 117 started in Germany and Austria on 12 January 1998 with the pilot movie “Der Kronzeuge”.  Over 6.67 million people watched the series in Germany.  The series ended in 2002.

Description 
The Medicopter 117 is a fictitious rescue helicopter somewhere in the German Alps whose crews rescue people in danger.

The most expensive episode was the last episode in the first season. In the episode “Der Absturz”, a helicopter crashes in the mountains after a collision with a cable car rope. The crash sequence took one minute and cost 1 million DM to film.

The episode "Geisterflieger" (Insecticide) was originally set to air on 11 September 2001. This episode was supposed to be the first one of season four. Because of the episode's parallels to the attacks of 9/11, it was broadcast on a later date.

But the producers broadcast "Geisterflieger" on 17 September 2002 because its plot was crucial for the entire series. The paramedic Enrico Contini had his first appearance there. Some of the plotlines had to be refilmed because some of the former characters were gone and new ones had appeared in the series. So there are two different versions of this episode. The fourth season began with the episode "Rettet Susi" (Save Susi) on 18 September 2001.

From 2008 to 2012, all the Medicopter 117 seasons were released on DVD.

Helicopters 
The Medicopter 117 is a BK 117 made by the German helicopter manufacturer Messerschmitt-Bölkow-Blohm.  The BK 117 has a special color scheme in red and yellow.

Medicopter 117 used two helicopters. The producers borrowed the first helicopter (registration D-HECE) from the DRF (Deutsche Rettungsflugwacht). When they did not use the D-HECE for the series, it flew real rescue missions at DRF locations. The DRF had ended its cooperation by the beginning of the fifth season. Later, the D-HECE was painted in the DRF colors (red and white).

The second helicopter (registration D-HEOE) was a former police helicopter in Baden-Württemberg. After its Medicopter career, the D-HEOE flew rescue missions for different operators like DRF, IFA (Internationale Flugambulanz) and the Austrian operator Flymed. This helicopter was used for sightseeing flights a few times. Today, the D-HEOE serves as an offshore helicopter in the North Sea.

List of episodes

Cancellation
Shortly after the end of the 7th season, RTL announced that it would no longer invest into making the series. The reason they gave was that ″We showed everything there was to show, normal rescues, rescues on ships, rescues in the mountains, rescues from helicopter to helicopter, rescues on motorway bridges and many, many dramatic scenes. Over time, this would all just become similar or even repeat itself. That's why we're forced to stay with 82 episodes in 7 seasons.″ (RTL press release)

See also
List of German television series

External links
 

1998 German television series debuts
2007 German television series endings
1998 Austrian television series debuts
1990s Austrian television series
2000s Austrian television series
Aviation television series
German-language television shows
RTL (German TV channel) original programming
ORF (broadcaster) original programming